Landes is a department in the Nouvelle-Aquitaine region, Southwestern France, with a long coastline on the Atlantic Ocean to the west. It borders Gers to the east, Pyrénées-Atlantiques, to the south, Lot-et-Garonne to the north-east, and Gironde to the north. It also borders the Atlantic Ocean to the west. Located on the Atlantic coast, it had a population of 413,690 as of 2019. Its prefecture is Mont-de-Marsan.

The department is the second-largest department in France and its covers the Forest of Landes. The southwestern part of the department is part of the wider conurbation of Biarritz and Bayonne across the Pyrénées-Atlantique border.

History
Landes is one of the original 83 departments that were created during the French Revolution on 4 March 1790. It was created from parts of the provinces of Guyenne and Gascony.

During the first part of the 19th century large parts of the department were covered with poorly drained heathland which is the origin of its name. The vegetation covered rich soil and was periodically burned off, leaving excellent pasturage for sheep, which around 1850 are thought to have numbered between 900,000 and 1,000,000 in this area. The sheep were managed by shepherds who moved around on stilts and became proficient at covering long distances thus supported. Most of the sheep departed during the second half of the nineteenth century when systematic development of large pine plantations transformed the landscape and the local economy.

One of the most famous citizens of the Landes was the 19th-century French economist Frédéric Bastiat.

The Nobel Prize–winning novelist François Mauriac set his novels in the Landes.

Geography
The Landes is part of the current region of Nouvelle-Aquitaine. With an area stretching over more than 9000 km2, Landes is, after Gironde, the second largest department of the metropolitan French territory.

It is well known for the Côte d'Argent beach which is Europe's longest and attracts many surfers to Mimizan and Soorts-Hossegor each year. It is also home to a château called Château de Gaujacq that was built in 1686.

Demographics
Population development since 1801:

Principal towns

The most populous commune is Mont-de-Marsan, the prefecture. As of 2019, there are 5 communes with more than 10,000 inhabitants:

Politics

Departmental Council of Landes
The president of the Departmental Council has been Xavier Fortinon of the Socialist Party since 2017. He succeeded former president of the National Assembly Henri Emmanuelli upon his death.

National representation
In the 2017 legislative election, Landes elected the following members of the National Assembly:

In the Senate, Landes is represented by two members: Éric Kerrouche and Monique Lubin. Both have served since the 2017 Senate election.

Economy

Agriculture
Landes is known for its large pine forest which is the raw material for a timber and resin industries in the region. The forest was planted in the early nineteenth century to prevent erosion of the region's sandy soil by the sea.

Tourism
Landes is famous for its seaside resorts and natural spots, such as:

See also 
 Cantons of the Landes department
 Communes of the Landes department
 Arrondissements of the Landes department
 Château de Belhade 
 Château de Castillon
 Château de Lacaze
 Château de Ravignan
 Château du Prada

References

External links 

  Prefecture website
  Departmental Council website

  

 
1790 establishments in France
Departments of Nouvelle-Aquitaine
States and territories established in 1790